Harbour View Football Club is a Jamaican football club based in Kingston that currently plays in the top flight Jamaica National Premier League.

Harbour View is nicknamed the Stars of the East or Easters and play their home games at Harbour View Stadium.

History
Founded by Vin Blaine along with the Harbour View community in the 1960s, the professional club, Harbour View F.C., was officially established on March 4, 1974. Then, 25 years later, the club was officially incorporated as a limited liability company and was the first Jamaica football club to become incorporated.

Harbour View F.C. has developed a reputation for being the first in Jamaica in many aspects. The Stars of the East became the first club to have an official website, and the first to build a world-class football stadium. Ricardo Gardner was the inaugural Jamaica National Premier League player to transfer to a major European league after joining the Bolton Wanderers in 1998. Club management is also setting the pace in bringing true professionalism to Jamaica's football landscape. In addition, at the beginning of the 2006 season, the club's equipment was sponsored by Adidas. The club generates revenue through sponsorships, match tickets, and other businesses such as stadium bars and Western Union.

Honours 
Domestic
Jamaica National Premier League
 Winners (5): 2000, 2007, 2010, 2013, 2022
JFF Champions Cup
 Winners (4): 1994, 1998, 2001, 2002
 Runners-up (2): 2003, 2005
International
CFU Club Championship
 Winners (2): 2004, 2007

Team management

Technical Director: Donovan Hayles
Asst Coach: Howard Straw
Goalkeeper Coach: Clive Wedderburn
Team Manager: Annmarie Massey
Asst Team Manager: Robert Lee
Physiotherapist: Karen Julius
Physical Trainer: Andrew Hines
Physical Trainer: Neville Mighton
Equipment Manager: Dwayne Blake
Asst Equipment: Jermaine Malcolm

International competition 
1987 CONCACAF Champions' Cup
 First Round v.  L'Etoile de Morne-à-l'Eau—1:3, 2:0 (L'Etoile de Morne-à-l'Eau advances 4:3 on penalties)
CFU Club Championship 2000
 Group stage v.  Violette AC—5:0
 Group stage v.  Paradise SC—1:0
 Group stage v.  Roots Alley Ballers—3:0
 Championship Group v.  W Connection—1:3
 Championship Group v.  Joe Public F.C.—1:1
 Championship Group v.  Carioca F.C. 2:1
CFU Club Championship 2002
 Preliminary Round v.  George Town SC—0:3, 7:1 (Harbour View F.C. advances 10:1 on aggregate)
 Group stage v.  US Robert—4:1
 Group stage v.  W Connection—1:2
CFU Club Championship 2004
 First Round v.  Ideal SC—1:15, 15:0 (Harbour View F.C. advances 30:1 on aggregate)
 Semi-finals v.  Inter Moengotapoe—4:6, 3:2 (Harbour View F.C. advances 9:6 on aggregate)
 Final v.  Tivoli Gardens F.C.—1:1, 1:2 (Harbour View F.C. wins 3:2 on aggregate)
CONCACAF Champions' Cup 2005
 Quarterfinals v.  D.C. United—1:2, 1:2 (D.C. United advances 4:2 on aggregate)
CFU Club Championship 2006
 Group stage v.  Aigle Noir AC—1:0
 Group stage v.  Positive Vibes—5:0
 Group stage v.  SV Centro Social Deportivo Barber—2:0
 Semi-finals v.  W Connection—2:3
CFU Club Championship 2007
 Group stage v.  Puerto Rico Islanders—2:2
 Group stage v.  Inter Moengotapoe—1:2
 Group stage v.  SAP F.C.—10:0
 Quarterfinals v.  Portmore United—2:0
 Semi-finals v.  San Juan Jabloteh—0:0 (Harbour View F.C. advances 10:9 on penalties)
 Final v.  Joe Public F.C.—2:1
CONCACAF Champions' Cup 2008
 Quarterfinals v.  D.C. United—1:1, 0:5 (D.C. United advances 6:1 on aggregate)
CONCACAF Champions League 2008–09
 Preliminary Round v.  UNAM Pumas—0:3 (UNAM Pumas advances 3:0 on aggregate)

References

External links
Official Website
Profile at Golocaljamaica
Reggae Boyz Supporterz Club

 
Football clubs in Jamaica
Association football clubs established in 1974
1974 establishments in Jamaica